Oymur (Oimuur) is a rural locality (a selo) in Kabansky District, Republic of Buryatia, Russia. The population was 1,380 as of 2010. There are 17 streets.

Geography 
Oymur is located 63 km north of Kabansk (the district's administrative centre) by road. Dubinino is the nearest rural locality.

References 

Rural localities in Kabansky District
Populated places on Lake Baikal